Nick Taylor (born April 14, 1988) is a Canadian professional golfer who plays on the PGA Tour where he has won twice.

Early life and amateur career
Taylor was born in Winnipeg, Manitoba and grew up in Abbotsford, British Columbia. His home golf course is Ledgeview Golf and Country Club. He graduated from the University of Washington and won the 2007 Canadian Amateur Championship.

In 2008, Taylor qualified for the U.S. Open, in which he missed the cut by three strokes. He also finished T53 at the 2008 RBC Canadian Open. He qualified for the 2009 U.S. Open at Bethpage Black, where he did make the cut, carding a 65 in the second round, the record for lowest by an amateur in major's history. He finished tied for 36th, being the lowest amateur of the championship. He also became the number one world amateur golfer according to the R&A World Amateur Golf Ranking. In September 2009, he won the Mark H. McCormack Medal for being on top of the World Amateur Golf Ranking after the U.S. Amateur.

Professional career
Taylor turned professional in late 2010. He played on PGA Tour Canada from 2011 to  2013, compiling 10 top-10 finishes in 25 starts. In 2013, he finished 7th on the Order of Merit and earned an exemption into the final stage of the Web.com Tour qualifying school, where he finished 11th to earn status for the 2014 season. He finished 69th in the 2014 Web.com Tour regular season, then 23rd in the Web.com Tour Finals to earn his PGA Tour card for the 2014–15 season.

In November 2014, Taylor won his first PGA Tour event at the Sanderson Farms Championship. Taylor's win was the first on the PGA Tour for a Canadian-born player in seven years, when Mike Weir won the 2007 Frys.com Open.

In February 2020, Taylor entered the final round of the AT&T Pebble Beach Pro-Am with a one shot lead over Phil Mickelson. Taylor shot a final round 70 in windy conditions and won the tournament by four strokes over Kevin Streelman. The win was his first full-strength tournament victory on the PGA Tour, and his second overall. The win qualified him for his first Masters Tournament.

In February 2023, Taylor finished runner-up at the WM Phoenix Open, two shots behind Scottie Scheffler. This result also moved him to his highest world ranking at 73rd.

Amateur wins
2006 BC Junior
2006 Canadian Junior
2007 Canadian Amateur Championship
2009 Sahalee Players Championship

Other amateur career accomplishments
 Recipient of the 2010 Ben Hogan Award
 Recipient of the 2009 Mark H. McCormack Medal
 Runner-up, 2009 U.S. Amateur Public Links
 Number one, World Amateur Golf Ranking, June 14, 2009, for 20 weeks
 Low amateur, 2009 U.S. Open
 Placed 2nd in the 2008 NCAA Division I Men's Golf Championships
 Placed 10th at the 2008 U.S. Amateur
 2008 National Men's Order of Merit
 Royal Canadian Golf Association National Amateur Team member
 Advanced to quarterfinals of the 2007 U.S. Amateur
 Advanced to quarterfinals of the 2006 Canadian Amateur
 Placed third at 2005 Canadian Junior Championship

Professional wins (2)

PGA Tour wins (2)

Results in major championships
Results not in chronological order in 2020.

LA = Low amateur
CUT = missed the half-way cut
"T" = tied
NT = No tournament due to COVID-19 pandemic

Results in The Players Championship

CUT = missed the halfway cut
"T" indicates a tie for a place
C = Canceled after the first round due to the COVID-19 pandemic

Results in World Golf Championships

1Cancelled due to COVID-19 pandemic

NT = No tournament
"T" = Tied

Team appearances
Amateur
Eisenhower Trophy (representing Canada): 2008
Four Nations Cup (representing Canada): 2009 (winners)

Professional
World Cup (representing Canada): 2018

See also
2014 Web.com Tour Finals graduates

References

External links

Canadian male golfers
Washington Huskies men's golfers
PGA Tour golfers
Korn Ferry Tour graduates
Golfing people from Manitoba
Golfing people from British Columbia
Sportspeople from Winnipeg
Sportspeople from Abbotsford, British Columbia
1988 births
Living people